Thana Chatborirak  (born May 29, 1987 in Thailand), nickname Nong, is a Thai model, actor

Early life and education 
Thana was born on 29 May 1987 in Bangkok. Is the second son of Lephong Mahanikhajorn and Ngamthip Chatbirirak, with Thana having one brother, Pakorn Chatborirak and another brother, Pat Chatborirak and another adopted sister. One person is the new day Wanmai Chatborirak.

Thana graduated from Pongpoowadol Kindergarten, attended Assumption College (Thailand) And graduated from high school Triam Udom Suksa School And higher education. Previously, Thana studied at the Faculty of Science Chulalongkorn University and moved to study and graduate from  Faculty of Social Administration Thammasat University

Career 
Thana entered the industry by being a guest of Pakorn, along with Pat chat Borirak on the intoxicating program. After that, Phatra had the opportunity to shoot many advertisements and became a model for many magazines later on Channel 3. Gave Ng to the series about recording karma, and after that, Nong signed a contract for actors under the Thai color television channel 3

Filmography

Film

Television series

References

External links 

1987 births
Living people
Thana Chatborirak
Thana Chatborirak
Thana Chatborirak
Thana Chatborirak
Thana Chatborirak
Thana Chatborirak
Thana Chatborirak
Thana Chatborirak
Thana Chatborirak